Greeley County is a county in the U.S. state of Nebraska. As of the 2010 census, the population was 2,538. Its county seat is Greeley.

In the Nebraska license plate system, Greeley County is represented by the prefix 62 (it had the 62nd-largest number of vehicles registered in the county when the license plate system was established in 1922).

History
Greeley County was created in 1871 and organized in 1872. It was named after Horace Greeley, a newspaper editor and politician of the mid-19th century. Greeley encouraged western settlement with the motto  "Go West, young man."

Geography
The Cedar River flows southeastward through the NE corner of Greeley County, and the North Loup River flows SSE through the SW corner of the county.

Major highways

  U.S. Highway 281
  Nebraska Highway 11
  Nebraska Highway 22
  Nebraska Highway 56
  Nebraska Highway 91

Adjacent counties

 Wheeler County (north)
 Boone County (northeast)
 Nance County (southeast)
 Howard County (south)
 Sherman County (southwest)
 Valley County (west)

Demographics

As of the 2000 United States Census, there were 2,714 people, 1,077 households, and 734 families in the county. The population density was 5 people per square mile (2/km2). There were 1,199 housing units at an average density of 2 per square mile (1/km2). The racial makeup of the county was 97.94% White, 0.66% Black or African American, 0.07% Native American, 0.07% Asian, 0.77% from other races, and 0.48% from two or more races. 0.85% of the population were Hispanic or Latino of any race.

There were 1,077 households, out of which 29.30% had children under the age of 18 living with them, 59.00% were married couples living together, 6.40% had a female householder with no husband present, and 31.80% were non-families. 30.50% of all households were made up of individuals, and 18.80% had someone living alone who was 65 years of age or older. The average household size was 2.46 and the average family size was 3.08.

The county population contained 26.90% under the age of 18, 5.90% from 18 to 24, 21.60% from 25 to 44, 22.40% from 45 to 64, and 23.20% who were 65 years of age or older. The median age was 42 years. For every 100 females there were 97.10 males. For every 100 females age 18 and over, there were 92.20 males.

The median income for a household in the county was $28,375, and the median income for a family was $34,159. Males had a median income of $22,036 versus $17,056 for females. The per capita income for the county was $13,731. About 11.90% of families and 14.60% of the population were below the poverty line, including 12.10% of those under age 18 and 20.50% of those age 65 or over.

Communities

Villages 

 Greeley Center
 Scotia
 Spalding
 Wolbach (part)

Unincorporated communities 

 Belfast
 Brayton
 Horace
 O'Connor
 Scotia Junction

Politics
Greeley County residents vote powerfully Republican. In no national election since 1976 has the county selected the Democratic Party candidate.

See also
 National Register of Historic Places listings in Greeley County, Nebraska

References

 
Horace Greeley
Nebraska counties
1872 establishments in Nebraska
Populated places established in 1872